Tiffany Tolnay (born May 7, 1987) is a former American collegiate artistic gymnast. She was a member of the Georgia Gym Dogs from 2006 to 2009, contributing to all four of the team's consecutive National Championship wins during that time.

Early life 
Tolnay was born in Texas on May 7, 1987, to James, who was a member of the Arkansas Razorbacks football team and a University of Texas at Dallas graduate, and Melissa Tolnay (née Grant), also an Arkansas graduate. Her younger brother, Austin, was a UT-Dallas graduate also. On Wednesday, July 3, 2013, he was killed in an automobile accident in Decatur, Texas. He was 24 at the time.

Tolnay began gymnastics training at the age of five, in 1992.

Gymnastics career

2002–05: Club competitive career 
Tolnay advanced to Level 10 for the 2002 season, following her move to the newly opened Texas Dreams Gymnastics to train under former world champion Kim Zmeskal.

References 

1987 births
Georgia Gym Dogs gymnasts
University of Georgia alumni
Living people
Level 10 gymnasts
American female artistic gymnasts
People from Grapevine, Texas
People from Lewisville, Texas